Henry McLemore was a sports columnist for the Hearst Newspapers organization.  He is mainly known for his advocacy of the internment of Japanese-Americans in World War II.

McLemore also wrote that Americans should have no patience "with the enemy or with anyone whose veins carry his blood."

References

Year of birth missing
Year of death missing
American columnists
Hearst Communications people